Kenneth Gilbert Glass (1913-1961) was a sailor from Canada, who represented his country at the 1932 Summer Olympics in Los Angeles, United States.

Sources
 

1913 births
1961 deaths
Sportspeople from Toronto
Canadian male sailors (sport)
Olympic sailors of Canada
Sailors at the 1932 Summer Olympics – 6 Metre
Medalists at the 1932 Summer Olympics
Olympic bronze medalists for Canada
Olympic medalists in sailing